Roger Levy is a British science fiction writer. He is published by Gollancz and Titan. His books are deeply melancholic, and explore issues of belief (with a focus on religion) and the nature of reality. He has been compared to Philip K. Dick in that regard, though he could be said to operate more within the British disaster novel tradition.

Books by Roger Levy 
 Reckless Sleep, 2001, Gollancz
 Dark Heavens, 2004, Gollancz
 Icarus, 2006, Gollancz
 The Rig, 2018, Titan

References

External links

Year of birth missing (living people)
Living people
British science fiction writers
British male novelists